Hopewell is an unincorporated community in Lee County, Alabama, United States.

References

Unincorporated communities in Lee County, Alabama
Unincorporated communities in Alabama